Vicksburg National Military Park preserves the site of the American Civil War Battle of Vicksburg, waged from March 29 to July 4, 1863. The park, located in Vicksburg, Mississippi  (flanking the Mississippi River), also commemorates the greater Vicksburg Campaign which led up to the battle. Reconstructed forts and trenches evoke memories of the 47-day siege that ended in the surrender of the city. Victory here and at Port Hudson, farther south in Louisiana, gave the Union control of the Mississippi River.

Battlefield

The park includes 1,325 historic monuments and markers,  of historic trenches and earthworks, a  tour road, a  walking trail, two antebellum homes, 144 emplaced cannons, the restored gunboat USS Cairo (sunk on December 12, 1862, on the Yazoo River), and the Grant's Canal site, where the Union Army attempted to build a canal to let their ships bypass Confederate artillery fire.

The Cairo, also known as the "Hardluck Ironclad," was the first U.S. ship in history to be sunk by a torpedo/mine. It was recovered from the Yazoo in 1964.

The Illinois State Memorial has 47 steps, one for every day Vicksburg was besieged.

Campaign against Vicksburg

 Battle of Chickasaw Bayou
 Battle of Arkansas Post
 Battle of Grand Gulf (April 29, 1863)
 Battle of Snyder's Bluff (April 29 – May 1)
 Battle of Port Gibson (May 1)
 Battle of Raymond (May 12)
 Battle of Jackson (May 14)
 Battle of Champion Hill (May 16)
 Battle of Big Black River Bridge (May 17)
 Siege of Vicksburg (May 18 – July 4)

Cemetery
The  Vicksburg National Cemetery, is within the park. It has 18,244 interments (12,954 unidentified).

The time period for Civil War interments was 1866 to 1874. The cemetery is not open to new interments.
The cemetery has only one Commonwealth war grave, of an airman of Royal Australian Air Force buried during World War II.

Grant's Canal
The remnants of Grant's Canal, a detached section of the military park, are located across from Vicksburg near Delta, Louisiana. Union Army Major General Ulysses S. Grant ordered the project, started on June 27, 1862, as part of his Vicksburg Campaign, with two goals in mind. The first was to alter the course of the Mississippi River in order to bypass the Confederate guns at Vicksburg. For various technical reasons the project failed to meet this goal. The river did change course by itself on April 26, 1876. The project met its second goal, keeping troops occupied during the laborious maneuvering required to begin the Battle of Vicksburg.

Administrative history
The national military park was established on February 21, 1899, to commemorate the siege and defense of Vicksburg. The park and cemetery were transferred from the War Department to the National Park Service (NPS) on August 10, 1933.

In the late 1950s, a portion of the park was transferred to the city as a local park in exchange for closing local roads running through the remainder of the park. It also allowed for the construction of Interstate 20. The monuments in land transferred to the city are still maintained by the NPS. As with all historic areas administered by the NPS, the park was listed on the National Register of Historic Places on October 15, 1966. Over half a million visitors visit the park every year.

In 2000 the Mississippi House of Representatives approved funding a monument to recognize African-American soldiers in the United States civil war.

See also

 Michigan Memorial
 Cedar Hill Cemetery (Vicksburg, Mississippi)

References

External links

The National Parks: Index 2001–2003. Washington: U.S. Department of the Interior.
 601-262-2100

Official NPS website: Vicksburg National Military Park
Main park map link: 
Grant's Canal map link: 
Vicksburg National Cemetery map link: 
Vicksburg National Military Park, National Park Service at Google Cultural Institute

Historic American Engineering Record (HAER) documentation, filed under Vicksburg, Warren County, MS:

 
Protected areas established in 1899
Battlefields of the Western Theater of the American Civil War
Protected areas of Madison Parish, Louisiana
National Battlefields and Military Parks of the United States
Protected areas on the Mississippi River
Mississippi in the American Civil War
American Civil War museums in Mississippi
Historic American Engineering Record in Mississippi
Museums in Warren County, Mississippi
National Park Service areas in Mississippi
National Park Service areas in Louisiana
Protected areas of Warren County, Mississippi
American Civil War on the National Register of Historic Places
National Register of Historic Places in Madison Parish, Louisiana
Conflict sites on the National Register of Historic Places in Mississippi
National Register of Historic Places in Warren County, Mississippi
Parks on the National Register of Historic Places in Mississippi
Commonwealth War Graves Commission cemeteries in the United States
1899 establishments in Mississippi
Cemeteries on the National Register of Historic Places in Mississippi